Robert Holme, of York, was an English Member of Parliament.

He was a Member (MP) of the Parliament of England for City of York in November 1414. He was Mayor of York 3 February 1413–14.

References

14th-century births
1433 deaths
15th-century English people
People from York
Members of the Parliament of England (pre-1707)
Lord Mayors of York